Evans Butte is a  summit located in the Grand Canyon, in Coconino County of northern Arizona, US. It is situated at the north end of Sagittarius Ridge, three miles south-southwest of King Arthur Castle, and two miles southeast of Dox Castle. According to the Köppen climate classification system, Evans Butte is located in a cold semi-arid climate zone, with precipitation runoff draining west to the Colorado River via Shinumo Creek, Hotauta Canyon, and Monadnock Amphitheater. The butte is composed of Pennsylvanian-Permian Supai Group overlaying the cliff-forming  Mississippian Redwall Limestone, and Cambrian Tonto Group. Evans Butte was climbed solo by Harvey Butchart on October 11, 1976, thereby making it the 76th of the 83 summits which he climbed in the Grand Canyon.

Richard Tranter Evans

Evans Butte was named after Richard Tranter Evans (1881–1966), U.S. Geological Survey senior topographic engineer from 1899 to 1951, who surveyed and mapped this area of the Grand Canyon in 1904. In the course of his mapping, this cartographer bestowed several nearby geographical features with an Arthurian legend naming theme, e.g. King Arthur Castle, Guinevere Castle, Elaine Castle, Merlin Abyss, Gawain Abyss, Bedivere Point, Lancelot Point, and Galahad Point.  Richard T. Evans was a protégé of François E. Matthes. Evans completed 107 topographic mapping assignments, which included several national park areas. He drew the first topographic maps of Pikes Peak, the Grand Canyon, and Salt Lake City. He was the acting superintendent of Zion National Park from 1925 to 1926, and superintendent of Hawaii National Park from 1927 to 1928. He was a member of the Cosmos Club, The Explorers Club, American Society of Civil Engineers, and a Member Emeritus of American Society for Photogrammetry. This geographical feature's name was officially adopted in 1969 by the U.S. Board on Geographic Names.

See also
 Geology of the Grand Canyon area

References

External links 

 Weather forecast: National Weather Service
 History of the Topographic Branch Richard T. Evans author
 Matthes – Evans topographic map of Grand Canyon National Park: Library of Congress
 Richard Tranter Evans photo: USGS
 Evans Butte and Guinevere Castle photo by Harvey Butchart

Grand Canyon
Landforms of Coconino County, Arizona
Buttes of Arizona
North American 1000 m summits
Colorado Plateau
Grand Canyon National Park
Grand Canyon, North Rim
Sandstone formations of the United States
Grand Canyon, North Rim (west)